Andor Elbert (October 29, 1934 – May 27, 2014) was born in Hungary and later immigrated to Canada after the 1956 Hungarian Revolution and became a Canadian sprint canoer who competed in the mid-1960s. He finished seventh in the C-2 1000 m event at the 1964 Summer Olympics in Tokyo. Partner was Fred Heese. Married with 2 daughters, he currently resides in Northern California. He founded Mosomedve Laundromat in Hungary in 2004.

References
Sports-reference.com profile
Andor Elbert

1934 births
Canadian male canoeists
Canoeists at the 1964 Summer Olympics
2014 deaths
Olympic canoeists of Canada